Alpha Sigma Rho, also known as Alpha Sigs, ASR, and Lovely Ladies in Red, is a sorority for service projects directed to the Asian-American community. 
 
The sorority was founded in 1998 at the University of Georgia at Athens. Alpha Sigma Rho was the first Asian-interest sorority established in the state of Georgia. It is based on the principles of academic excellence, interpersonal growth, moral development, and strength in unity.

History 

Alpha Sigma Rho  was founded as an Asian interest sorority in 1998 by twelve women at the University of Georgia: Irene Chien, Sandra Chu, Young Jeon, Debbie Kwon, Angela Lu, Lynn Nguyen, Anne See, Anna Suh, Juliette Taylor, Jessica Yoo, Suzanne Yoo, and Jasmine Yu. Collectively, these women are referred to as the "founding mothers". The sorority has spread to universities in Maryland, Ohio, Pennsylvania, and Texas.

Symbols 
The founding mothers adopted symbols for the sorority. Its flower is the cala lily and its mascot is the swan. The sorority's colors are red, silver, and white. Its gemstone is the opal. Its symbol is Nu, the Chinese symbol for woman.

Activities 

On a national level, the sorority is pledged to support the National Ovarian Cancer Coalition. The sorority's various chapters work with their local Asian-interest philanthropic organizations to help them with fundraising and publicity. These include China Care, Austin Children's Services, and Circle of Sisterhood.

Membership 

Applicants may seek membership as college undergraduates or as graduate students. Membership is open to those who meet the requirements, regardless of race, nationality, religion, and a number of other factors.

Notable members 
Tipa "Mol" Nawawattanasub, CEO, YLG Bullion & Futures, Thailand's biggest gold trader

Chapters 
Alpha Sigma Rho has twelve active chapters as of 2022. Active chapters are indicated in bold. Inactive chapters are indicated in italic.

References 

Student organizations established in 1998
Fraternities and sororities in the United States
1998 establishments in Georgia (U.S. state)
Asian-American organizations
Asian-American fraternities and sororities